Paweł Świętek (28 October 1924 – 16 February 1989) was a Polish gymnast. He competed in eight events at the 1952 Summer Olympics.

References

1924 births
1989 deaths
Polish male artistic gymnasts
Olympic gymnasts of Poland
Gymnasts at the 1952 Summer Olympics
People from Piekary Śląskie